The 2006 NCAA Division Swimming and Diving Championships refer to one of two events held during March 2006 to determine the team and individual national champions of Division I men's and women's collegiate swimming and diving in the United States:
2006 NCAA Division I Men's Swimming and Diving Championships– held at the Georgia Tech Aquatic Center at the Georgia Institute of Technology in Atlanta, Georgia and won by Auburn
2006 NCAA Division I Women's Swimming and Diving Championships – held at the Gabrielsen Natatorium at the University of Georgia in Athens, Georgia and won by Auburn

See also
List of college swimming and diving teams

References

NCAA Division I Men's Swimming and Diving Championships
NCAA Division I Swimming And Diving Championships
NCAA Division I Swimming And Diving Championships